Jeffrey Ajluni is the Senior Vice President, Partnerships and Brand Engagement for the Major League Soccer club D.C. United in Washington, D.C., having joined the team in September 2021. Ajluni leads all partnership development and partner activation and services for the team. Prior to joining DC United he was Senior Vice President of Strategic Partnerships and Business Development for the US Travel Association in Washington, D.C. Ajluni oversaw all new business growth for the association, with a focus on developing partnerships and alliances that strategically benefit the U.S. travel industry.

Before his role with the US Travel Association, Ajluni was Chief Commercial Officer for the Trust for the National Mall overseeing corporate partnerships, high net revenue development, marketing and events from August 2016 to February 2019.

Ajluni spent much of his career as an executive in the professional sports, media operations and live entertainment industries and he holds the distinction of having worked in the National Hockey League, Major League Baseball, National Football League, English Premier League, National Basketball Association and Major League Soccer.

He served as vice president and general manager for FOX Sports Media Group in Washington, D.C. Before his move to Washington, Ajluni served as Group Vice President, Corporate Partnerships & Community Development for the St. Louis Blues, overseeing all corporate sales, service and partnerships, including broadcast and new media sales, and the further development of community partner programs, charitable efforts, and new business initiatives.

Ajluni was a full-time retained consultant for the Jacksonville Jaguars, working closely with Jaguars senior executives advising in the areas of revenue generation, staffing and recruiting, department structure, presentation materials, business prospecting, packaging and sponsorship category development.

Before joining the Jaguars Ajluni was Executive Vice President, Chief Revenue Officer for the Detroit Pistons and Palace Sports and Entertainment located in Auburn Hills, Michigan. He oversaw all revenue operations, including corporate partnerships, luxury and premium seating and ticketing.

Prior to joining the Detroit Pistons and Palace Sports & Entertainment, Ajluni spent 12 years with the Tampa Bay Buccaneers between January 2000 and December 2011, holding the positions of Director, Corporate Partnerships, Director, Marketing & Business Development, Director, Marketing and New Partner Development. Ajluni managed all aspects of the Buccaneers corporate partnerships department, including sales, service and activation.

While with the Tampa Bay Buccaneers, between 2005 and 2008, Ajluni led global sponsorship development for Manchester United FC located in Manchester, England (also owned by the Glazer family). Most notably, Ajluni worked closely with Bryan Glazer (Manchester United co-owner) to secure AIG Corporation as the club's shirt sponsor. It was the largest sponsorship deal in the history of team sports.

Before joining the Tampa Bay Buccaneers, Ajluni spent nine years with the Detroit Red Wings, Detroit Tigers and Olympia Entertainment, Inc. of Detroit, Michigan, where he held a variety of positions. Ajluni is a native of Bloomfield Hills, Michigan, and a graduate of Northwood University in Midland, Michigan.

References

1968 births
Living people
People from Bloomfield Hills, Michigan
Tampa Bay Buccaneers executives